Chakkarapalli is a village in the Papanasam taluk of Thanjavur district, Tamil Nadu, India. It is located in between Thanjavur - Kumbakonam highway. A more than thousand years old village having proof of Chakkaravageswarar Temple.

Demographics 

As per the 2001 census, Chakkarapalli had a total population of 6082 with 2856 males and 3226 females. The sex ratio was 1130. The literacy rate was 84.53.

Police Station 
chakkarapalli is under the control of Ayyampettai police station located near pasupathikovil

Transport

Bus Stand 
The nearest bus stand is ayyampettai Bus stand is located near by the Government Higher secondary school Ayyampettai. Ayyampettai is well connected with roads between the Highway of Thanjavur - Kumbakonam. All sorts of Buses provide service here.

Railway Station 
The nearest railway station is Ayyampettai railway station is located towards Aharamangudi Road near from Anjuman mosque.

Education 

 Chakkarapalli Panchayat Government Secondary School, North Street.
 Chakkarapalli Panchayat Government School, Big Street.

Association 
 Paasamalar Welfare Association (www.paasamalar.in) 88 708 808 28 
 Al Eeman Welfare Association
 Ramalan Welfare Association
 Ayyampet Chakkarapalli Blood Donate

References 

 

https://temple.dinamalar.com/en/new_en.php?id=1028

Villages in Thanjavur district

Chakravageswarar Temple, Chakkarappalli